John Fortunatus Higgins (31 October 1884 – 28 July 1936) was an Australian politician.

He was born in Glenorchy to orchardist Matthew Higgins and Anne Barry. He attended school at New Town, Tasmania and became a journalist. On 2 February 1913 he married Marion Honoria Harlow; the following year he married Felicitas Laverty (known as Mina) on 24 December 1914. He and Mina had a daughter, Patricia Margaret Higgins in 1917. From 1921 to 1936 he was a Labor member of the New South Wales Legislative Council. He opposed Jack Lang and sat as Federal Labor in the 1930s. Higgins died at Rose Bay in 1936.

References

1884 births
1936 deaths
Australian Labor Party members of the Parliament of New South Wales
Members of the New South Wales Legislative Council
20th-century Australian politicians